The Reflection Tour was the first major headlining concert tour by American girl group Fifth Harmony. Visiting Europe, North America and Asia (one date in Adu Dhabi), the tour supported their debut studio album, Reflection.  Fifth Harmony was not backed by a band or backing singers, instead, they opted for studio recorded versions of songs from their album and an acoustic set for covers. The setlist consisted mostly of songs from Reflection, with several adapted from their debut extended play, Better Together along with several medley covers. The shows garnered acclaim from critical reviews, many praising the group's vocal performance, the show's overall themes and the song transitions.

The first North American leg of the tour was uninterrupted. However, for the second North American leg, which ran from July until October, the group cancelled two dates, citing a performance at the BET Players Awards for July 18, three days after their second leg started. On the other date, two of the members were diagnosed with bronchitis, prompting them to cancel the Washington show on September 16. These dates were not rescheduled. Both legs of the tour sold out the majority of its shows and received positive reviews. Yahoo! livestreamed the March 24 Boston concert.

Different sets were utilized for different legs of the tour. In the first leg, concerts were structured with photographer umbrella lights serving as the background for every show. Props such as a car were used in several tracks. The photographer umbrella lights were used in smaller numbers, with only several placed on the top of the stage and a five-piece screen in the background. For the third leg of the tour, a standard red backdrop and multiple stage lights, both up and down, were used along with a different outfit color. Including every date on this tour, the first show began on February 27, 2015 in San Francisco and ended on Abu Dhabi on February 12, 2016, nearly a year after the tour's initial announcement. Sixteen of the twenty-five dates were sold out.

Background
Following Fifth Harmony's success on the American televised singing competition The X Factor, the group released their debut extended play, Better Together. Before releasing their extended play, the group was an opening act for the I Wish Tour, headlined by Cher Lloyd. The following year, MTV selected the group as part of a series of Artists to Watch. The concert series saw them perform several tracks from their debut studio album, Reflection. Simultaneously, the girls were opening acts on Demi Lovato's Neon Lights Tour, performing in arenas throughout North America.

MTV nominated the group under its "Artist to Watch" category, along other rising acts. Fifth Harmony would end up winning the category at the 2014 MTV Video Music Awards and become the first all-female group to win this title. The following year, an MTV-sponsored headlining tour was announced in January 2015. This was to be Fifth Harmony's first major tour following small-scale headlining tours in 2013 and 2014, and slots as opening acts on tours for artists such as Lovato and Lloyd.

In conjunction with the tour announcement on January 7, 2015, a cover of the hit song "Uptown Funk" was uploaded onto Fifth Harmony's YouTube account, featuring the group and their three opening acts: Jacob Whitesides, Jasmine V, and Mahogany Lox.

Extensions

Summer Reflection Tour

After completing the first leg of the tour, the group decided to go on another leg in North America. This tour was a revamped version of the original tour, in which they were performing more songs in new and bigger venues. The group announced the summer leg of the tour at a poolside party sponsored by Candie's with the event broadcast by Periscope.

On this tour, Fifth Harmony wore their first ever custom-designed costumes by Marina Toybina, a four-time Emmy award winner. Choreography for this setlist was conducted by Sean Bankhead, who worked on the group's dance routine for their single, "Worth It".

The first show started on July 15 and ended on September 16 for a total of 31 shows, all located in the United States except for one show in The Bahamas. New production and a different setlist including new covers and more songs were planned for this leg of the tour.

European Reflection Tour

The success of the group's previous tour legs prompted them to issue another extension. This was the group's first tour to feature European dates. It was announced on September 2, 2015 through the photo sharing app, Snapchat, with each member announcing a different city through their individual accounts. The tour began on October 26 and concluded on November 9.

All the shows in this tour were sold out. Dionne Bromfield was the opening act for shows in London and Manchester and Paul Rey for shows in Paris and Frankfurt. The group performed songs in five countries around Europe, including Spain, France, and the United Kingdom.

The outfits used for this leg remained the same from previous extensions, with the exception being a change in color. For this leg, the group's outfits featured an all red design, a distinction from the blue color the girls used in their previous tours. Toybina returned as the designer for the group's outfits, who has designed concert outfits for notable artists such as Katy Perry, Ariana Grande, and Taylor Swift.

The promotional poster for the leg featured the same image used for the cover art of the 2015 computer animated fantasy-comedy film Hotel Transylvania 2 track, "I'm in Love with a Monster". The poster was revealed through the group's individual social media accounts.

Opening acts
 Jacob Whitesides (North America—Leg 1)
 Jasmine V (North America—Leg 1)
 Mahogany Lox (North America—Leg 1)
 Bea Miller (North America—Leg 2)
 Natalie La Rose (North America—Leg 2)
 Debby Ryan and The Never Ending (North America—Leg 2)
 Dionne Bromfield (United Kingdom—Leg 3)
 Paul Rey (France and Germany—Leg 3)

Setlists

Critical response
The tour was well received from critics with many praising the group's empowerment themes. In a positive review of the Bethlehem show, Matt Christine from Sight of Sound, complemented the group for their cohesiveness, stating that their, "sound is monumental in scale when they sang together as a unit." He continues his review by praising the group for not "embracing the stereotypical pop" many artists follow and the setlist, calling it "incredibly smart choice for the group as these songs are incredibly strong and the majority of their fans who came out expected to hear just those tracks." Erica Rucker of Leo Weekly praised the group for their empowering themes on the Louisville show, saying, "[b]eing told that you are beautiful and “Worth It” can actually save a young life." She concludes that statement by stating that, "no matter what it takes, no matter who tells young people that they matter — be it a pop group or the smiling parents who snapped cell photos of the children on the sly — kids need to know that they have value."

Mikael Wood of the Los Angeles Times praised the group's song transition at the Los Angeles show, from the "rugged cover of Hozier's "Take Me to Church"", to the "miniature rave" for "This Is How We Roll" and the "confetti blast" at the show's last song, "Boss", which Wood reminisced to a stadium feel. His only criticism came from the record voice encouraging the audience members that they were "capable of achieving" their "wildest dreams". Wood finishes his review by saying that "when Fifth Harmony was showing rather than telling — almost made you believe it." In a review adapted by USA Today from Serene Dominic, writer for The Arizona Republic, Dominic complimented the vocal abilities of the five girls, highlighting Ally Brooke for her "whistle register". She found the acoustic set "perplexing" but overall remained positive rain her review.

In a positive review of the Wilbur show in Boston, Maura Johnston of The Boston Globe commended the group for their vocals and the show's overall theme. Johnston expands on the reasoning behind Fifth Harmony's success, saying they have a "muscle to succeed where other girl bands failed, and why its followers, who packed the theater to capacity, are so loyal." She also highlight the brand the group holds, which is embodied by the female-empowerment. During the Mariah Carey medley, Johnston noted how there was "equal time being distributed among the members" and how any "diva moments" were "absent" on stage.

Some critics were not so positive. In a mixed-positive review, Amanda Ventura of Phoenix New Times raved about the group's vocals, in particular, Brooke who described her note as a "Mariah Carey-level high F meant to induce goosebumps on anyone with ears". Ventura criticized the first half of the show, calling it "terrible" and something out of a "well-funded talent show performance". She comments on the group's chemistry which seemed "off". One of the acts that she said was "worth sitting through" was Bea Miller, who compared her vocal range to Janis Joplin. Conversely, Elliot Friar of Emertainment Weekly, in review of the Boston show, commended the performances of the opening acts and the empowering effect the group left on stage saying that the stage was left with "one last roar of empowerment, self-love, and love for others."

Chris Gray from The Houston Press ranked the Houston show in the top five concerts of the week, for the week dated August 3.

Shows

Cancelled shows

Notes

References

External links
Fifth Harmony Official Website

2015 concert tours
Fifth Harmony concert tours